Kolad railway station is the first railway station on the Konkan Railway. It is at a distance of 12.916 km down from Roha railway station which comes under Konkan Railway. The succeeding station is Indapur railway station, a halt station.

Kolad has one platform serving four halting trains each day. No trains originate from this station. It is located 80 km from Pune's Lohegaon airport. This station falls in the Ratnagiri Division of the State of Maharashtra in western coastal India.

In 2012, the Konkan Railway's ro-ro (roll-on, roll-off) service was operating from Kolad railway station to Verna in Goa (417 km, 8–10 hours journey), Suratkal (721 km, 24 hours journey) in Karnataka, besides other regional routes.

Besides the railway station, Kolad is known for adventure sports, in particular white-water rafting.

References

External links
Trucks loaded at Kolad on ro-ro train of the Konkan Railway (video)

Railway stations along Konkan Railway line
Railway stations in Raigad district
Railway stations opened in 1993
Ratnagiri railway division